Harry Mungles Fletcher (4 September 1879 – 7 June 1917) was a Scottish amateur footballer who played in the Scottish League for Queen's Park as a full back.

Personal life 
Fletcher attended Glasgow University and worked as a geography teacher at North Kelvinside Higher Grade School and at John Neilson Institution. He served in the Royal Field Artillery and the Royal Horse Artillery during the First World War and was wounded at the Battle of the Somme. Fletcher was holding the rank of second lieutenant when he was killed by shellfire at Zillebeke on 7 June 1917. He was buried in Railway Dugouts Burial Ground (Transport Farm) Cemetery.

Career statistics

References

1879 births
Scottish footballers
Scottish Football League players
Footballers from Kilmarnock
Association football fullbacks
Queen's Park F.C. players
Royal Field Artillery officers
1917 deaths
British Army personnel of World War I
British military personnel killed in World War I
Alumni of the University of Glasgow
Scottish educators
Royal Horse Artillery officers
Burials at Railway Dugouts Burial Ground (Transport Farm) Commonwealth War Graves Commission Cemetery